Australian Athletics Championships for women have been conducted since 1930.

At the first National Championships, only 3 events (100 yards, 80 metres hurdles, and High Jump) were contested, but the programme has since expanded to include the full track and field programme.  Until 1963, championships were only held once every two years.

The most successful athlete at the Championships has been thrower Gael Martin who won 20 events in the 1970s and 1980s.

Australia's national champions in athletics are listed below, by event.

100 metres
Note: 100 yards until 1967

1930: Chrissie Dahm
1931: Not held
1932: Eileen Wearne
1933: Emily Brookes
1934: Not held
1935: Edith Robinson
1936: Edith Robinson
1937: Decima Norman
1938: Not held
1939: Not held
1940: Lola Forster
1941: Not held
1942: Not held
1943: Not held
1944: Not held
1945: Not held
1946: Not held
1947: Not held
1948: Joyce King
1949:  Not held
1950: Marjorie Jackson
1951:  Not held
1952: Marjorie Jackson
1953:  Not held
1954: Marjorie Jackson
1955:  Not held
1956: Wendy Hayes
1957:  Not held
1958: Marlene Mathews
1959:  Not held
1960: Pat Duggan
1961:  Not held
1962: Glenys Beasley
1963: Dianne Bowering
1964: Joyce Bennett
1965: Debbie Thompson (USA)
1966: Joan Henricksen
1967: Dianne Burge
1968: Dianne Burge
1969: Jenny Lamy

1970: Raelene Boyle
1971: Raelene Boyle
1972: Raelene Boyle
1973: Raelene Boyle
1974: Denise Boyd
1975: Denise Boyd
1976: Raelene Boyle
1977: Raelene Boyle
1978: Debbie Wells
1979: Denise Boyd
1980: Denise Boyd
1981: Debbie Wells
1982: Helen Davey
1983: Diane Holden
1984: Debbie Wells
1985: Jenny Flaherty (dead-heat with Diane Holden)
1986: Diane Holden
1987: Diane Holden
1988: Jane Flemming
1989: Sue Broadrick
1990: Jane Flemming
1991: Monique Dunstan
1992: Melinda Gainsford
1993: Melinda Gainsford
1994: Gwen Torrence (USA) 
1995: Melinda Gainsford
1996: Cathy Freeman
1997: Melinda Gainsford
1998: Melinda Gainsford
1999: Lauren Hewitt
2000: Melinda Gainsford
2001: Lauren Hewitt
2002: Lauren Hewitt
2003: Sharon Cripps
2004: Gloria Kemasuode (NGR)
2005: Sally McLellan
2006: Sally McLellan
2007: Sally McLellan
2008: Fiona Cullen
2009: Sally McLellan

2010: Melissa Breen
2011: Sally McLellan
2012: Melissa Breen
2013: Toea Wisil
2014: Sally Pearson
2015: Melissa Breen
2016: Melissa Breen
2017: Toea Wisil
2018: Riley Day
2019: Naa Anang
2020: Not held
2021: Hana Basic
2022: Zoe Hobbs

200 metres
Note: 220 yards until 1967

1930: Not held
1931: Not held
1932: Not held
1933: Amy Bremer
1934: Not held
1935: Edith Robinson
1936: Edith Robinson
1937: Decima Norman
1938: Not held
1939: Not held
1940: Jean Coleman
1941: Not held
1942: Not held
1943: Not held
1944: Not held
1945: Not held
1946: Not held
1947: Not held
1948: Joyce King
1949:  Not held
1950: Marjorie Jackson
1951:  Not held
1952: Marjorie Jackson
1953:  Not held
1954: Marjorie Jackson
1955:  Not held
1956: Betty Cuthbert
1957:  Not held
1958: Marlene Mathews
1959:  Not held
1960: Betty Cuthbert
1961:  Not held
1962: Glennys Beasley
1963: Joyce Bennett
1964: Joyce Bennett
1965: Dianne Bowering
1966: Joyce Bennett
1967: Jenny Lamy
1968: Dianne Burge
1969: Jenny Lamy

1970: Raelene Boyle
1971: Raelene Boyle
1972: Raelene Boyle
1973: Raelene Boyle
1974: Denise Boyd
1975: Denise Boyd
1976: Raelene Boyle
1977: Raelene Boyle
1978: Denise Boyd
1979: Denise Boyd
1980: Denise Boyd
1981: Debbie Wells
1982: Sharon Ruxton
1983: Denise Boyd
1984: Debbie Wells
1985: Maree Holland
1986: Diane Holden
1987: Diane Holden
1988: Kerry Johnson
1989: Sue Broadrick
1990: Cathy Freeman
1991: Cathy Freeman (dead-heat with Esther Paolo)
1992: Melinda Gainsford
1993: Melinda Gainsford
1994: Cathy Freeman
1995: Melinda Gainsford
1996: Cathy Freeman
1997: Melinda Gainsford
1998: Melinda Gainsford
1999: Lauren Hewitt
2000: Cathy Freeman
2001: Lauren Hewitt
2002: Lauren Hewitt
2003: Sharon Cripps
2004: Lauren Hewitt
2005: Lauren Hewitt
2006: Melanie Kleeberg
2007: Monique Williams (NZL)
2008: Makilesi Batimala (FIJ)
2009: Monique Williams (NZL)

2010: Jody Henry
2011: Sally McLellan
2012: Melissa Breen
2013: Monica Brennan
2014: Ella Nelson
2015: Ella Nelson
2016: Ella Nelson
2017: Toea Wisil
2018: Riley Day
2019: Zoe Hobbs (NZL)
2020: Not held
2021: Riley Day
2022: Georgia Hulls

400 metres
Note: 440 yards until 1967

1930: Not held
1931: Not held
1932: Not held
1933: Not held
1934: Not held
1935: Not held
1936: Not held
1937: Jean Coleman
1938: Not held
1939: Not held
1940: Irene Talbot
1941: Not held
1942: Not held
1943: Not held
1944: Not held
1945: Not held
1946: Not held
1947: Not held
1948: Shirley McConnachie
1949:  Not held
1950: Shirley Strickland
1951:  Not held
1952: Shirley Strickland
1953:  Not held
1954: Pam Bryant
1955:  Not held
1956: Shirley Strickland
1957:  Not held
1958: Brenda Jones
1959:  Not held
1960: Dixie Willis
1961:  Not held
1962: Dixie Willis
1963: Betty Cuthbert
1964: Dixie Willis
1965: Judy Pollock
1966: Judy Pollock
1967: Judy Pollock
1968: Sandra Brown
1969: Elaine Frawley

1970: Sandra Brown
1971: Cheryl Peasley
1972: Judy Pollock
1973: Charlene Rendina
1974: Marg Sargant
1975: Charlene Rendina
1976: Bethanie Nail
1977: Marian Fisher
1978: Maxine Corcoran
1979: Maxine Corcoran
1980: Raelene Boyle
1981: Terri Cater
1982: Raelene Boyle
1983: Denise Boyd
1984: Kim Robertson (NZL)
1985: Debbie Flintoff-King
1986: Debbie Flintoff-King
1987: Sally Fleming
1988: Maree Holland
1989: Maree Holland
1990: Sharon Stewart
1991: Renee Poetschka
1992: Sharon Stewart
1993: Renee Poetschka
1994: Renee Poetschka
1995: Cathy Freeman
1996: Renee Poetschka
1997: Cathy Freeman
1998: Cathy Freeman
1999: Cathy Freeman
2000: Cathy Freeman
2001: Nova Peris
2002: Catherine Murphy (GBR)
2003: Cathy Freeman
2004: Annabelle Smith
2005: Tamsyn Manou
2006: Jane Arnott (NZL)
2007: Tamsyn Manou
2008: Tamsyn Manou
2009: Tamsyn Manou

2010: Joanne Cuddihy (IRL)
2011: Tamsyn Manou
2012: Joanne Cuddihy (IRL)
2013: Caitlin Sargent-Jones
2014: Morgan Mitchell
2015: Anneliese Rubie
2016: Morgan Mitchell
2017: Morgan Mitchell
2018: Anneliese Rubie
2019: Bendere Oboya
2020: Not held
2021: Bendere Oboya
2022: Isabel Neal

800 metres
Note: 880 yards until 1967

1930: Not held
1931: Not held
1932: Not held
1933: Not held
1934: Not held
1935: Not held
1936: Not held
1937: Audrey Bradfield
1938: Not held
1939: Not held
1940: Betty Judge
1941: Not held
1942: Not held
1943: Not held
1944: Not held
1945: Not held
1946: Not held
1947: Not held
1948: Kit Mears
1949:  Not held
1950: Mavis Monaghan
1951:  Not held
1952: Stella Massey
1953:  Not held
1954: Beris Folland
1955:  Not held
1956: Joyce Hanger
1957:  Not held
1958: Brenda Jones
1959:  Not held
1960: Dixie Willis
1961:  Not held
1962: Dixie Willis
1963: Dixie Willis
1964: Dixie Willis
1965: Judy Pollock
1966: Judy Pollock
1967: Judy Pollock
1968: Sandra Brown
1969: Cheryl Peasley

1970: Cheryl Peasley
1971: Cheryl Peasley
1972: Judy Pollock
1973: Charlene Rendina
1974: Charlene Rendina
1975: Charlene Rendina
1976: Charlene Rendina
1977: Penny Gray
1978: Julie Schwass
1979: Charlene Rendina
1980: Terri Cater
1981: Terri Cater
1982: Heather Barralet
1983: Heather Barralet
1984: Heather Barralet
1985: Bronwyn Fleming
1986: Wendy Old
1987: Sarah Collins
1988: Sharon Stewart
1989: Sharon Stewart
1990: Wendy Old
1991: Sharon Stewart
1992: Jodie Nykvist-Hebbard
1993: Narelle Parr
1994: Sandy Dawson
1995: Sandy Dawson
1996: Lisa Lightfoot
1997: Saleena Roberts
1998: Tamsyn Manou
1999: Tamsyn Manou
2000: Tamsyn Manou
2001: Tamsyn Manou
2002: Tamsyn Manou
2003: Tamsyn Manou
2004: Rikke Ronholt (DEN)
2005: Katherine Katsanavakis
2006: Suzy Walsham
2007: Tamsyn Manou
2008: Tamsyn Manou
2009: Madeleine Pape

2010: Katherine Katsanavakis
2011: Tamsyn Manou
2012: Tamsyn Manou
2013: Kelly Hetherington
2014: Brittany McGowan
2015: Brittany McGowan
2016: Brittany McGowan
2017: Lora Storey
2018: Brittany McGowan
2019: Catriona Bisset
2020: Not held
2021: Catriona Bisset
2022: Catriona Bisset

1500 metres
Note: One mile until 1967

1960: Not held
1961: Not held
1962: Not held
1963: Not held
1964: Not held
1965: Beth Stanford
1966: Beth Stanford
1967: Margaret Clifford
1968: Brenda Carr
1969: Cheryl Peasley
1970: Raie Thompson
1971: Jenny Orr
1972: Jenny Orr
1973: Jenny Orr
1974: Jenny Orr
1975: Angela Cook
1976: Judy Pollock
1977: Angela Cook
1978: Alison Wrench
1979: Penny Gray
1980: Sue Muir
1981: Margaret Reddish
1982: Sharon Dalton
1983: Linda Gray (NZL)
1984: Anne McKenzie (NZL)
1985: Geng Ziunuan (CHN)
1986: Penny Just
1987: Jackie Perkins
1988: Marg Leaney
1989: Liz Miller
1990: Wendy Old
1991: Suzy Walsham
1992: Jodie Nykvist-Hebbard
1993: Susie Power
1994: Marg Leaney
1995: Sonia O'Sullivan (IRE)
1996: Marg Crowley
1997: Mandy Giblin
1998: Liz Miller
1999: Sarah Jamieson

2000: Naomi Mugo (KEN)
2001: Suzy Walsham
2002: Georgie Clarke
2003: Suzy Walsham
2004: Sarah Jamieson
2005: Sarah Jamieson
2006: Sarah Jamieson
2007: Lisa Corrigan
2008: Veronique Molan
2009: Sarah Jamieson
2010: Kaila McKnight
2011: Zoe Buckman
2012: Kaila McKnight
2013: Zoe Buckman
2014: Zoe Buckman
2015: Heidi See
2016: Heidi See
2017: Heidi See
2018: Linden Hall
2019: Chloe Tighe
2020: Not held
2021: Linden Hall
2022: Abbey Caldwell

3000 metres

1970: Not held
1971: Not held
1972: Not held
1973: Not held
1974: Jenny Orr
1975: Angela Cook
1976: Irene Cooke
1977: Phyllis Lazarakis
1978: Phyllis Lazarakis
1979: Rhonda Taylor
1980: Sue Muir
1981: Jenny Lund
1982: Megan Sloane
1983: Anne Lord
1984: Donna Gould
1985: Jackie Perkins
1986: Jackie Perkins
1987: Jackie Perkins
1988: Jackie Perkins
1989: Ann Hare (NZL)
1990: Krishna Stanton
1991: Jenny Lund
1992: Rhona Makepeace
1993: Krishna Stanton
1994: Liz Miller
1995: Not held
1996: Not held
1997: Not held
1998: Not held
1999: Not held
2000: Not held
2001: Not held
2002: Not held
2003: Anna Thompson
2004: Not held
2005: Not held
2006: Not held
2007: Lauren Fleshman (USA)
2008: Chloe Tighe
2009: Melanie Daniels

2010: Not held
2011: Not held
2012: Not held
2013: Not held
2014: Not held
2015: Bridey Delaney
2016: Not held
2017: Not held
2018: Not held
2019: Not held
2020: Not held
2021: Genevieve Gregson
2022: Rose Davies

5000 metres

1995: Carolyn Schuwalow
1996: Kate Anderson
1997: Kate Anderson
1998: Anne Cross
1999: Natalie Harvey
2000: Anne Cross
2001: Elizabeth Miller
2002: Hayley McGregor
2003: Benita Johnson
2004: Georgie Clarke
2005: Benita Johnson
2006: Eloise Wellings
2007: Benita Johnson
2008: Georgie Clarke
2009: Sarah Jamieson
2010: Eloise Wellings
2011: Belinda Martin
2012: Kaila McKnight
2013: Kaila McKnight
2014: Emily Brichacek
2015: Magdalene Masai (KEN)
2016: Genevieve Lacaze
2017: Heidi See
2018: Celia Sullohern
2019: Melissa Duncan
2020: Jessica Hull
2021: Andrea Seccafien (CAN)
2022: Jessica Hull

10,000 metres

1980: Not held
1981: Not held
1982: Not held
1983: Maureen Moyle
1984: Sally Pearson
1985: Mary O'Connor (NZL)
1986: Tania Turney
1987: Jackie Perkins
1988: Carolyn Schuwalow
1989: Coral Farr
1990: Sue Mahony
1991: Jenny Lund
1992: Sue Hobson
1993: Sue Hobson
1994: Sue Hobson
1995: Lisa Martin
1996: Not held
1997: Kylie Risk
1998: Natalie Harvey
1999: Natalie Harvey
2000: Sonia O'Sullivan (IRE)
2001: Sonia O'Sullivan (IRE)
2002: Kerryn McCann
2003: Anna Thompson
2004: Benita Johnson
2005: Hayley McGregor
2006: Benita Johnson
2007: Jessica Ruthe (NZL)
2008: Melinda Vernon
2009: Lara Tamsett
2010: Eloise Wellings
2011: Eloise Wellings
2012: Joyce Chepkirui (KEN)
2013: Neely Spence Gracey (USA)
2014: Nikki Chapple
2015: Veronica Wanjiru (KEN)
2016: Eloise Wellings
2017: Camille Buscomb (NZL)
2018: Celia Sullohern
2019: Hitomi Niiya (JPN)

2020: Genevieve Gregson
2021: Rose Davies
2022: Rose Davies

100 metres hurdles
Note: 90 yards or 80 metres hurdles until 1967

1930: Clarice Kennedy
1931: Not held
1932: Jean Manson
1933: Clarice Kennedy
1934: Not held
1935: Clarice Kennedy
1936: Clarice Kennedy
1937: Isabel Grant
1938: Not held
1939: Not held
1940: Decima Norman
1941: Not held
1942: Not held
1943: Not held
1944: Not held
1945: Not held
1946: Not held
1947: Not held
1948: Shirley Strickland
1949:  Not held
1950: Shirley Strickland
1951:  Not held
1952: Shirley Strickland
1953:  Not held
1954: Gwen Wallace
1955:  Not held
1956: Norma Austin
1957:  Not held
1958: Norma Thrower
1959:  Not held
1960: Norma Thrower
1961:  Not held
1962: Jackie Dufall
1963: Pam Kilborn
1964: Pam Kilborn
1965: Pam Kilborn
1966: Pam Kilborn
1967: Pam Kilborn
1968: Pam Kilborn
1969: Pam Kilborn

1970: Maureen Caird
1971: Diane Pease
1972: Penny Gillies
1973: Gaye Dell
1974: Gaye Dell
1975: Gaye Dell
1976: Gaye Dell
1977: Penny Gillies
1978: Cheryl Boswell
1979: Penny Gillies
1980: Penny Gillies
1981: Penny Gillies
1982: Glynis Nunn
1983: Glynis Nunn
1984: Glynis Nunn
1985: Glynis Nunn
1986: Glynis Nunn
1987: Jenny Laurendet
1988: Jane Flemming
1989: Helen Pirovano (NZL)
1990: Jenny Laurendet
1991: Jayne Moyes
1992: Jayne Moyes
1993: Jane Flemming
1994: Jane Flemming
1995: Jane Flemming
1996: Sam Farquharson (GBR)
1997: Jane Flemming
1998: Debbi Edwards
1999: Eunice Barber (FRA)
2000: Valerie Manning (USA)
2001: Jacqui Munro
2002: Jacqui Munro
2003: Jacqui Munro
2004: Jacqui Munro
2005: Sally Pearson (dead-heat with Fiona Cullen)
2006: Sally Pearson
2007: Sally Pearson
2008: Andrea Miller (NZL)
2009: Sally Pearson

2010: Hayley Butler
2011: Sally Pearson
2012: Shannon McCann
2013: Shannon McCann
2014: Sally Pearson
2015: Sally Pearson
2016: Michelle Jenneke
2017: Sally Pearson
2018: Sally Pearson
2019: Celeste Mucci
2020: Not held
2021: Elizabeth Clay
2022: Elizabeth Clay

200 metres hurdles

1968: Not held
1969: Not held
1970: Maureen Caird
1971: Maureen Caird
1972: Pam Ryan
1973: Gaye Dell
1974: Gaye Dell
1975: Gaye Dell

400 metres hurdles

1970: Not held
1971: Not held
1972: Not held
1973: Not held
1974: Not held
1975: Lyn Young
1976: Marian Fisher
1977: Marian Fisher
1978: Marian Fisher
1979: Lyn Foreman
1980: Lyn Foreman
1981: Lyn Foreman
1982: Lyn Foreman
1983: Debbie Flintoff
1984: Debbie Flintoff
1985: Debbie Flintoff
1986: Debbie Flintoff-King
1987: Sally Flemming
1988: Debbie Flintoff-King
1989: Helen Graham
1990: Jenny Laurendet
1991: Debbie Flintoff-King
1992: Gail Millar-Luke
1993: Renee Poetschka
1994: Lauren Poetschka
1995: Jacqueline Parker (GBR)
1996: Rebecca Campbell
1997: Evette Cordy
1998: Stephanie Price
1999: Lauren Poetschka
2000: Lauren Poetschka
2001: Jana Pittman
2002: Jana Pittman
2003: Jana Pittman
2004: Rebecca Wardell
2005: Lauren Wells
2006: Sonia Brito
2007: Lauren Wells
2008: Lauren Wells
2009: Tamsyn Lewis

2010: Lauren Wells
2011: Lauren Wells
2012: Jess Gulli
2013: Lauren Wells
2014: Lauren Wells
2015: Lauren Wells
2016: Lauren Wells
2017: Lauren Wells
2018: Lauren Wells
2019: Lauren Wells
2020: Not held
2021: Lauren Wells
2022: Sarah Carli

3000 metres steeplechase

1999: Melissa Rollison
2000: Melissa Rollison
2001: Rachel Penney (NZL)
2002: Melissa Rollison
2003: Victoria Mitchell
2004: Marnie Ponton
2005: Kristy Villis
2006: Melissa Rollison
2007: Donna MacFarlane
2008: Donna MacFarlane
2009: Donna MacFarlane
2010: Melissa Rollison
2011: Victoria Mitchell
2012: Milly Clark
2013: Genevieve Gregson
2014: Victoria Mitchell
2015: Genevieve Gregson
2016: Madeline Hills
2017: Victoria Mitchell
2018: Victoria Mitchell
2019: Paige Campbell
2020: Not held
2021: Genevieve Gregson
2021: Rose Davies
2022: Amy Cashin

Marathon

1980: Jane Kuchins
1981: Rosemary Longstaff
1982: Barbara McKerrow (NZL)
1983: Annick Loir-Lebreton (FRA)
1984: Ngaire Drake (NZL)
1985: Ngaire Drake (NZL)
1986: Ngaire Drake (NZL)
1987: Tani Ruckle
1988: Ngaire Drake (NZL)
1989: Jan Fedrick
1990: Hiromi Satoyama (JPN)
1991: Jackie Hallam
1992: Mari Tanigawa (JPN)
1993: Eriko Asai (JPN)
1994: Joanne Cowan
1995: Julie Rose
1996: Sylvia Rose
1997: Susan Hobson
1998: Lisa Dick
1999: Carolyn Schuwalow
2000: Krishna Stanton
2001: Krishna Stanton
2002: Heather Turland
2003: Helen Verity-Tolhurst
2004: Jenny Wickham
2005: Jackie Fairweather
2006: Jennifer Gillard
2007: Eliza Mayger
2008: Lisa Flint
2009: Lisa Flint
2010: Roxie Fraser
2011: Kirsten Molloy
2012: Lauren Shelley
2013: Sharon Ryder
2014: Tarli Bird
2015: Kelly-Ann Varey
2016: Virginia Moloney
2017: Makda Harun
2018: Kerri Hodge
2019: Ingrid Cleland

10 kilometre road walk

1982: Not held
1983: Sue Cook
1984: Sally Pierson
1985: Kerry Saxby
1986: Kerry Saxby
1987: Kerry Saxby
1988: Kerry Saxby
1989: Miriam Harding
1990: Kerry Saxby-Junna
1991: Jane Saville
1992: Jane Saville
1993: Kerry Saxby-Junna
1994: Kerry Saxby-Junna
1995: Kerry Saxby-Junna
1996: Kerry Saxby-Junna
1997: Jane Saville
1998: Jane Saville
1999: Kerry Saxby-Junna
2000: Lisa Paolini
2001: Lyn Ventris
2002: Claire Woods
2003: Simone Wolowiec
2004: Claire Woods
2005: Simon Wolowiec
2006: Natalie Saville
2007: Megan Szirom
2008: Not held
2009: Not held

20 kilometre road walk

1980: Not held
1981: Not held
1982: Not held
1983: Sally Pierson
1984: Kerry Saxby
1985: Kerry Saxby
1986: Kerry Saxby
1987: Kerry Saxby
1988: Bev Hayman
1989: Kerry Saxby-Junna
1990: Sue Cook
1991: Sharon Schnyder
1992: Gabriele Blythe
1993: Anne Manning
1994: Anne Manning
1995: Anne Manning
1996: Simone Wolowiec
1997: Jill Maybir-Barrett
1998: Wendy Muldoon
1999: Not held
2000: Erica Alfredi (ITA)
2001: Kerry Saxby-Junna
2002: Jane Saville
2003: Jane Saville
2004: Jane Saville
2005: Jane Saville
2006: Jane Saville
2007: Claire Tallent
2008: Johanna Jackson (GBR)
2009: Cheryl Webb
2010: Claire Tallent
2011: Claire Tallent
2012: Claire Tallent
2013: Tanya Holliday
2014: Kelly Ruddick
2015: Tanya Holliday
2016: Rachel Tallent
2017: Regan Lamble

Pole vault

1995: Emma George
1996: Melissa Harris
1997: Emma George
1998: Emma George
1999: Tatiana Grigorieva
2000: Emma George
2001: Jenni Dryburgh (NZL)
2002: Tatiana Grigorieva
2003: Melina Hamilton (NZL)
2004: Kym Howe
2005: Melina Hamilton (NZL)
2006: Tatiana Grigorieva
2007: Kym Howe
2008: Alana Boyd
2009: Alana Boyd
2010: Elizabeth Parnov
2011: Charmaine Lucock
2012: Vicky Parnov
2013: Alana Boyd
2014: Elizabeth Parnov
2015: Alana Boyd
2016: Elizabeth Parnov
2017: Eliza McCartney (NZL)
2018: Nina Kennedy
2019: Olivia McTaggart (NZL)
2020: Not held
2021: Nina Kennedy
2022: Nina Kennedy

High jump

1930: Rosa Winter
1931: Not held
1932: Doris Carter
1933: Doris Carter
1934: Not held
1935: Doris Carter
1936: Doris Carter
1937: Doris Carter
1938: Not held
1939: Not held
1940: Doris Carter
1941: Not held
1942: Not held
1943: Not held
1944: Not held
1945: Not held
1946: Not held
1947: Not held
1948: Coral Stewart
1949:  Not held
1950: Jacqueline Baumann
1951:  Not held
1952: Mary Grace
1953:  Not held
1954: Carol Bernoth
1955:  Not held
1956: Jan Cooper
1957:  Not held
1958: Michele Mason
1959:  Not held
1960: Helen Frith
1961:  Not held
1962: Carolyn Wright
1963: Robyn Woodhouse
1964: Michele Brown
1965: Robyn Woodhouse
1966: Michele Brown
1967: Robyn Woodhouse
1968: Carolyn Wright
1969: Carolyn Wright

1970: Carolyn Wright
1971: Carolyn Wright
1972: Raylene Parke
1973: Carolyn Lewis
1974: Raylene Parke
1975: Raylene Parke
1976: Christine Annison
1977: Christine Annison
1978: Katrina Gibbs
1979: Vanessa Browne
1980: Christine Stanton
1981: Christine Stanton
1982: Katrina Gibbs
1983: Christine Stanton
1984: Vanessa Browne
1985: Christine Stanton
1986: Christine Stanton
1987: Christine Stanton
1988: Vanessa Browne
1989: Vanessa Ward
1990: Vanessa Ward
1991: Alison Inverarity
1992: Tania Murray (NZL)
1993: Alison Inverarity
1994: Alison Inverarity
1995: Alison Inverarity
1996: Lea Haggett (GBR)
1997: Alison Inverarity
1998: Alison Inverarity
1999: Alison Inverarity
2000: Alison Inverarity
2001: Carmen Hunter
2002: Petrina Price
2003: Miyuki Aoyama (JPN)
2004: Petrina Price
2005: Sophia Begg
2006: Ellen Pettitt
2007: Ellen Pettitt
2008: Catherine Drummond
2009: Petrina Price

2010: Petrina Price
2011: Ellen Pettitt
2012: Miyuki Fukumoto (JPN)
2013: Miyuki Fukumoto (JPN)
2014: Eleanor Patterson
2015: Eleanor Patterson
2016: Eleanor Patterson
2017: Eleanor Patterson
2018: Cassie Purdon
2019: Nicola McDermott
2020: Not held
2021: Nicola McDermott
2022: Nicola Olyslagers

Long jump

1930: Not held
1931: Not held
1932: Not held
1933: Connie Hudson
1934: Not held
1935: Thelma Peake
1936: Thelma Peake
1937: Thelma Peake
1938: Not held
1939: Not held
1940: Decima Norman
1941: Not held
1942: Not held
1943: Not held
1944: Not held
1945: Not held
1946: Not held
1947: Not held
1948: Judy Canty
1949:  Not held
1950: Judy Canty
1951:  Not held
1952: Verna Johnston
1953:  Not held
1954: Valerie Schwarzinger
1955:  Not held
1956: Erica Willis
1957:  Not held
1958: Beverley Watson
1959:  Not held
1960: Sylvia Mitchell
1961:  Not held
1962: Pam Kilborn
1963: Pam Kilborn
1964: Helen Frith
1965: Willye White (USA)
1966: Helen Frith
1967: Pam Kilborn
1968: Lenore Liscombe
1969: Diane Pease

1970: Diane Pease
1971: Diane Pease
1972: Lyn Tillett
1973: Erica Nixon
1974: Erica Nixon
1975: Erica Nixon
1976: Erica Nixon
1977: Lyn Jacenko
1978: Lyn Jacenko
1979: Lyn Jacenko
1980: Linda Garden
1981: Chris Stanton
1982: Linda Garden
1983: Robyn Strong
1984: Robyn Strong
1985: Linda Garden
1986: Robyn Lorraway
1987: Nicole Boegman
1988: Nicole Boegman
1989: Jayne Moffitt (NZL)
1990: Peta Kennedy
1991: Jayne Moffitt (NZL)
1992: Nicole Boegman
1993: Nicole Boegman
1994: Nicole Boegman
1995: Nicole Boegman
1996: Chantal Brunner (NZL)
1997: Chantal Brunner (NZL)
1998: Nicole Boegman
1999: Eunice Barber (FRA)
2000: Kylie Reed
2001: Chantal Brunner (NZL)
2002: Bronwyn Thompson
2003: Bronwyn Thompson
2004: Kerrie Taurima
2005: Kerrie Taurima
2006: Bronwyn Thompson
2007: Bronwyn Thompson
2008: Bronwyn Thompson
2009: Jacinta Boyd

2010: Jessica Penney
2011: Kerrie Perkins
2012: Kerrie Perkins
2013: Kerrie Perkins
2014: Brooke Stratton
2015: Chelsea Jaensch
2016: Brooke Stratton
2017: Naa Anang
2018: Brooke Stratton
2019: Naa Anang
2020: Not held
2021: Brooke Stratton
2022: Samantha Dale

Triple jump

1986: Anne Turnbull
1987: Lynette Smith
1988: Lynette Smith
1989: Karen Charlton
1990: Karen Charlton
1991: Jayne Moffitt (NZL)
1992: Leanne Stapylton-Smith (NZL)
1993: Nicole Boegman
1994: Yoko Morioka (JPN)
1995: Mariklud Viduka
1996: Shelley Stoddart (NZL)
1997: Tania Dixon (NZL)
1998: Connie Henry (GBR)
1999: Carmen Miller
2000: Nicole Mladenis
2001: Nicole Mladenis
2002: Nicole Mladenis
2003: Jeanette Bowles
2004: Nicole Mladenis
2005: Jeanette Bowles
2006: Linda Allen
2007: Jeanette Bowles
2008: Emma Knight
2009: Linda Allen
2010: Meggan O'Riley
2011: Emma Knight
2012: Ellen Pettitt
2013: Linda Leverton
2014: Linda Leverton
2015: Nneka Okpala (NZL)
2016: Nneka Okpala (NZL)
2017: Meggan O'Riley
2018: Meggan O'Riley
2019: Ellen Pettitt
2020: Not held
2021: Aliyah Parker
2022: Roksana Khudoyarova (UZB)

Shot put

1930: Not held
1931: Not held
1932: Not held
1933: Cora Hannan
1934: Not held
1935: Vera Cowan
1936: Vera Cowan
1937: Vera Cowan
1938: Not held
1939: Not held
1940: Cora Hannan
1941: Not held
1942: Not held
1943: Not held
1944: Not held
1945: Not held
1946: Not held
1947: Not held
1948: Pat Lucas
1949:  Not held
1950: Ann Shanley
1951:  Not held
1952: Val Lawrence
1953:  Not held
1954: Val Lawrence
1955:  Not held
1956: Mary Breen
1957:  Not held
1958: Margaret Woodlock
1959:  Not held
1960: Margaret Woodlock
1961:  Not held
1962: Mary Breen
1963: Jean Roberts
1964: Jean Roberts
1965: Jean Roberts
1966: Jean Roberts
1967: Jean Roberts
1968: Jean Roberts
1969: Jean Roberts

1970: Jean Roberts
1971: Anne Karner
1972: Anne Karner
1973: Christine Schultz
1974: Anne Karner
1975: Anne Karner
1976: Gael Mulhall
1977: Gael Mulhall
1978: Gael Mulhall
1979: Gael Mulhall
1980: Gael Mulhall
1981: Gael Mulhall
1982: Bev Francis
1983: Gael Mulhall
1984: Gael Martin
1985: Gael Martin
1986: Gael Martin
1987: Gael Martin
1988: Astra Vitols
1989: Astra Vitols
1990: Nicole Carkeek
1991: Daniela Costian
1992: Christine King (NZL)
1993: Daniela Costian
1994: Daniela Costian
1995: Lisa-Marie Vizaniari
1996: Georgette Reed (CAN)
1997: Beatrice Faumuina (NZL)
1998: Beatrice Faumuina (NZL)
1999: Tressa Thompson (USA)
2000: Helen Toussis
2001: Yoko Toyonaga (JPN)
2002: Michelle Haage
2003: Sumi Ichioka (JPN)
2004: Valerie Adams (NZL)
2005: Valerie Adams (NZL)
2006: Ana Pouhila (TGA)
2007: Ana Pouhila (TGA)
2008: Valerie Adams (NZL)
2009: Valerie Adams (NZL)

2010: Joanne Mirtschin
2011: Margaret Satupai
2012: Dani Stevens
2013: Terina Keenan (NZL)
2014: Terina Keenan (NZL)
2015: Chelsea Lenarduzzi
2016: Chelsea Lenarduzzi
2017: Alifatou Djibril
2018: Maddi Wesche (NZL)
2019: Victoria Owers (NZL)
2020: Not held
2021: Lyvante Su'Emai
2022: Emma Berg

Discus

1930: Not held
1931: Not held
1932: Not held
1933: Cora Hannan
1934: Not held
1935: Cora Hannan
1936: Doris Carter
1937: Cora Hannan
1938: Not held
1939: Not held
1940: Doris Carter
1941: Not held
1942: Not held
1943: Not held
1944: Not held
1945: Not held
1946: Not held
1947: Not held
1948: Charlotte MacGibbon
1949:  Not held
1950: Charlotte MacGibbon
1951:  Not held
1952: Jeanette Joy
1953:  Not held
1954: Lorraine Murphy
1955:  Not held
1956: Lois Jackman
1957:  Not held
1958: Lois Jackman
1959:  Not held
1960: Isabel De Neefe
1961:  Not held
1962: Rosslyn Williams
1963: Mary McDonald
1964: Mary McDonald
1965: Jean Roberts
1966: Jane Adams
1967: Jean Roberts
1968: Jean Roberts
1969: Jean Roberts

1970: Jean Roberts
1971: Anne Karner
1972: Sue Culley
1973: Sue Culley
1974: Anne Karner
1975: Anne Karner
1976: Denise Ashford
1977: Gael Mulhall
1978: Gael Mulhall
1979: Gael Mulhall
1980: Gael Mulhall
1981: Gael Mulhall
1982: Andrina Rovis-Herman
1983: Gael Mulhall
1984: Gael Martin
1985: Sue Reinwald
1986: Gael Martin
1987: Gael Martin
1988: Astra Vitols
1989: Daniela Costian
1990: Daniela Costian
1991: Daniela Costian
1992: Daniela Costian
1993: Daniela Costian
1994: Daniela Costian
1995: Daniela Costian
1996: Lisa-Marie Vizaniari
1997: Beatrice Faumuina (NZL)
1998: Beatrice Faumuina (NZL)
1999: Lisa-Marie Vizaniari
2000: Alison Lever
2001: Alison Lever
2002: Beatrice Faumuina (NZL)
2003: Beatrice Faumuina (NZL)
2004: Beatrice Faumuina (NZL)
2005: Beatrice Faumuina (NZL)
2006: Beatrice Faumuina (NZL)
2007: Dani Stevens
2008: Dani Stevens
2009: Dani Stevens

2010: Dani Stevens
2011: Dani Stevens
2012: Dani Stevens
2013: Terina Keenan (NZL)
2014: Dani Stevens
2015: Dani Stevens
2016: Dani Stevens
2017: Dani Stevens
2018: Dani Stevens
2019: Taryn Gollshewsky
2020: Not held
2021: Dani Stevens
2022: Jade Lally (GBR)

Javelin

1930: Not held
1931: Not held
1932: Not held
1933: Clarice Kennedy
1934: Not held
1935: Clarice Kennedy
1936: Clarice Kennedy
1937: Elsie Jones
1938: Not held
1939: Not held
1940: Charlotte MacGibbon
1941: Not held
1942: Not held
1943: Not held
1944: Not held
1945: Not held
1946: Not held
1947: Not held
1948: Charlotte MacGibbon
1949:  Not held
1950: Charlotte MacGibbon
1951:  Not held
1952: Charlotte MacGibbon
1953:  Not held
1954: Vera Pepper
1955:  Not held
1956: Patricia O'Neill
1957:  Not held
1958: Anna Pazera
1959:  Not held
1960: Anna Pazera
1961:  Not held
1962: Maureen Wright
1963: Anna Pazera
1964: Anna Pazera
1965: Pam Telfer
1966: Anna Pazera
1967: Anna Pazera
1968: Barbara Friedrich (USA)
1969: Mary Thomas

1970: Petra Rivers
1971: Petra Rivers
1972: Jenny Symon
1973: Jenny Symon
1974: Petra Rivers
1975: Chris Hunt
1976: Chris Hunt
1977: Pam Matthews
1978: Pam Matthews
1979: Pam Matthews
1980: Pam Matthews
1981: Petra Rivers
1982: Petra Rivers
1983: Petra Rivers
1984: Petra Rivers
1985: Jeanette Kieboom
1986: Sue Howland
1987: Sue Howland
1988: Kate Farrow
1989: Kaye Nordstrom (NZL)
1990: Louise McPaul
1991: Louise McPaul
1992: Akiko Mayajima (JPN)
1993: Louise McPaul
1994: Joanna Stone
1995: Kirsten Hellier (NZL)
1996: Tanja Damaske (GER)
1997: Joanna Stone
1998: Louise McPaul
1999: Hayley Wilson (NZL)
2000: Sueli Dos Santos (BRA)
2001: Bina Ramesh (FRA)
2002: Bina Ramesh (FRA)
2003: Bina Ramesh (FRA)
2004: Bina Ramesh (FRA)
2005: Kimberley Mickle
2006: Kimberley Mickle
2007: Kimberley Mickle
2008: Katherine Mitchell
2009: Kimberley Mickle

2010: Kimberley Mickle
2011: Kimberley Mickle
2012: Kimberley Mickle
2013: Kimberley Mickle
2014: Kimberley Mickle
2015: Sunette Viljoen (RSA)
2016: Lu Huihui (CHN)
2017: Kelsey-Lee Roberts
2018: Katherine Mitchell
2019: Kelsey-Lee Barber
2020: Not held
2021: Kathryn Mitchell
2022: Mackenzie Little

Hammer throw

1980: Not held
1981: Not held
1982: Not held
1983: Not held
1984: Not held
1985: Not held
1986: Not held
1987: Bernadette Serone
1988: Bernadette Serone
1989: Joanne Capper
1990: Bernadette Serone
1991: Bernadette Serone
1992: Deborah Sosimenko
1993: Deborah Sosimenko
1994: Deborah Sosimenko
1995: Deborah Sosimenko
1996: Olga Kuzenkova (RUS)
1997: Deborah Sosimenko
1998: Deborah Sosimenko
1999: Deborah Sosimenko
2000: Lisa Misipeka (ASA)
2001: Bronwyn Eagles
2002: Bronwyn Eagles
2003: Brooke Billett
2004: Bronwyn Eagles
2005: Bronwyn Eagles
2006: Brooke Billett
2007: Karyne Di Marco
2008: Bronwyn Eagles
2009: Bronwyn Eagles
2010: Gabrielle Neighbour
2011: Gabrielle Neighbour
2012: Gabrielle Neighbour
2013: Lara Nielsen
2014: Lara Nielsen
2015: Lara Nielsen
2016: Akane Watanabe (JPN)
2017: Lara Nielsen
2018: Alexandra Hulley
2019: Alexandra Hulley
2020: Not held
2021: Alexandra Hulley
2022: Alexandra Hulley

Pentathlon
Events: 80 metres hurdles, high jump, shot put, long jump, 200 m until 1970
Events: 100 metres hurdles, high jump, shot put, long jump, 200 m until 1977
Events: 100 metres hurdles, high jump, shot put, long jump, 800 m until discontinuation

1953:  Not held
1954:  Not held
1955:  Not held
1956: Norma Rose
1957:  Not held
1958: Marlene Middlemiss
1959:  Not held
1960: Helen Frith
1961:  Not held
1962: Helen Frith
1963: Pam Kilborn
1964: Helen Frith
1965: Helen Frith
1966: Helen Frith
1967: Pam Kilborn
1968: Pam Kilborn
1969: Jeanette Tandy
1970: Jeanette Tandy
1971: Diane Pease
1972: Lyn Tillett
1973: Erica Nixon
1974: Erica Nixon
1975: Erica Nixon
1976: Erica Nixon
1977: Erica Hooker
1978: Glynis Nunn
1979: Margaret Hamley
1980: Glynis Nunn

Heptathlon
Events: 100 metres hurdles, shot put, high jump, 200 m, long jump, javelin, 800 m

1980: Not held
1981: Glynis Nunn
1982: Glynis Nunn
1983: Terri Genge (NZL)
1984: Glynis Nunn
1985: Jocelyn Millar-Cubit
1986: Jane Flemming
1987: Jane Flemming
1988: Jane Flemming
1989: Sharon Jaklofsky-Smith
1990: Katie Ackerman
1991: Leisa Bruce
1992: Kylie Coombe
1993: Jane Flemming
1994: Jane Flemming
1995: Jane Jamieson
1996: Jane Jamieson
1997: Clare Thompson
1998: Jane Jamieson
1999: Sherryl Morrow
2000: Sherryl Morrow
2001: Jane Jamieson
2002: Clare Thompson
2003: Kylie Wheeler
2004: Kylie Wheeler
2005: Kylie Wheeler
2006: Kylie Wheeler
2007: Kylie Wheeler
2008: Kylie Wheeler
2009: Lauren Foote
2010: Rebecca Robinson
2011: Lauren Foote
2012: Megan Wheatley
2013: Portia Bing (NZL)
2014: Sophie Stanwell
2015: Veronica Torr (NZL)
2016: Sophie Stanwell
2017: Alysha Burnett
2018: Celeste Mucci
2019: Celeste Mucci
2020: Tori West
2021: Taneille Crase
2022: Taneille Crase

See also
 Australian athletics champions (men)
 Australian Championships in Athletics
 Athletics Australia

References

 Australian Athletics Historical Results

Women
Athletics
Australian
Lists of female athletes